WUCF-TV (channel 24) is a PBS member television station in Orlando, Florida, United States. Owned by the University of Central Florida (UCF), it is the region's sole PBS member station, reaching an estimated population of 4.6 million people in its viewing area. WUCF-TV is sister to WUCF-FM (89.9 MHz), Central Florida's secondary NPR station. The two outlets share studios on Research Parkway on the UCF campus. Through a channel sharing agreement with religious station WTGL (channel 45), the two stations transmit using WUCF-TV's spectrum from an antenna in unincorporated Bithlo, Florida.

Channel 24 had previously been WMFE-TV, the main ETV and PBS outlet for Central Florida from 1965 to 2011, when then-owner Community Communications dropped PBS programming in preparation for a sale. In response, UCF and Brevard Community College (BCC) partnered to approve the creation of WUCF-TV, a new PBS station to serve the Central Florida market. The station operated on the primary digital channel of BCC's PBS station, WBCC. Days after the agreement was reached to replace WMFE, Daytona Beach PBS station WDSC-TV announced that it would cease its membership due to financial hardship, leaving WUCF as the only PBS member station in Central Florida. In 2012, PBS programming returned to WMFE, as the station's ownership announced that it would sell all of the station's assets, except the studio facilities, to UCF for $3.3 million. In September 2012, WMFE was relaunched as WUCF following approval from the Federal Communications Commission (FCC).

On cable, the station is available in standard definition on channel 2 on Charter Spectrum, channel 4 on Comcast Xfinity, and channel 24 on CenturyLink Prism, and in high definition on Spectrum channel 1024, Xfinity channel 424, and CenturyLink Prism channel 1024.

History

WMFE-TV (1965–2012)
In 1963, the public school systems of Orange, Volusia, Lake, Osceola, Seminole, Brevard and Flagler counties formed Florida Central East Coast Educational Television with the goal of winning the license for channel 24. In the meantime, WDBO-TV (now WKMG-TV) and WLOF-TV (now WFTV) donated air time for educational Spanish-language and Florida history programs produced by the group.

WMFE-TV finally went on the air on March 15, 1965 from the campus of Mid Florida Tech. After only two years of operation, Orange County Public Schools became the sole operator of the station. In the early 1970s, the school district sold the station to Community Communications, a non-profit organization that would continue to operate the station for nearly four decades. In 1978, WMFE moved to the Union Park neighborhood east of Orlando, on the corner of SR 50 and O'Berry Hoover Road at the studios previously used by defunct independent station WSWB-TV (channel 35, now Fox owned-and-operated station WOFL).

In Fall 2010, Community Communications indicated it was suffering financial hardships that had led to furloughs. On April 1, 2011, WMFE announced that it would sell the station due to these financial difficulties and "critical uncertainties in federal and state funding". After WMFE-TV disaffiliated from PBS, V-me became the station's primary programming. Community Communications initially planned to sell the station to Community Educators of Orlando, a nonprofit controlled by Marcus Lamb, head of the Daystar Television Network. The new owners planned to air Daystar programming, but also intended to partner with UCF to air educational programming. In April 2012, WMFE ended the planned sale, saying "the current deal we had in place was being drawn out longer than we anticipated" and that "The market conditions have changed in a favorable way to be able to pursue other options for WMFE." The deal had foundered when the Federal Communications Commission questioned whether Lamb and the Daystar-aligned nonprofits were qualified to buy WMFE and another former PBS outlet, KDYW (formerly KWBU-TV) in Waco, Texas. Specifically, the FCC questioned whether the nonprofits listed as the prospective owners of WMFE and KDYW were actually straw buyers (i.e., fronts) for Daystar, and also doubted whether the stations would air enough educational programming to meet the conditions for the stations' non-commercial licenses.

WUCF-TV (2011–present)
When news spread of the sale of WMFE in 2011, a campaign was undertaken by local residents and students at UCF to try to keep an active PBS station in the Orlando market. On May 26, 2011, the UCF Board of Trustees approved a partnership with BCC to create WUCF-TV, the new primary PBS station for Central Florida. The new station leased the primary digital channel of WBCC, the PBS outlet owned by Brevard Community College, and operated from WBCC's facilities. However, BCC retained its license and the WBCC call letters. On June 2, PBS approved the creation of WUCF and announced that it would become Central Florida's primary PBS channel. The new station became the Orlando market's only PBS station, as WDSC-TV in Daytona Beach left PBS on July 1, concurrent with WMFE's departure from PBS and the launch of WUCF.

On June 21, 2012, Community Communications - the owners of WMFE - announced that it planned to sell all of WMFE-TV's assets, except the studio facilities, to UCF, allowing channel 24 to resume its status as Central Florida's PBS outlet. In August 2012, the FCC approved the sale of WMFE's license to UCF. UCF formally took control of channel 24 on September 26 and changed its call letters to WUCF-TV. The purchase of WMFE's license by UCF dissolved WUCF's partnership with BCC, and in November 2012, UCF completed the move of the WUCF-TV call letters and intellectual unit to the stronger channel 24.

Programming
WUCF-TV has added local content and university-related programs, such as Global Perspectives and Central Florida Roadtrip. 
Much of this content is added to their YouTube channel, uploaded as individual segments.
Separate YouTube channels exist for different shows, such as the Art & Soul channel for stories centered around musicians, photographers, and other artists.
The station carries a daily output of 12½ hours of children's programming on its main channel (not counting its PBS Kids subchannel launched on January 16, 2017).

Technical information

Subchannels
The station's digital signal is multiplexed:

Analog-to-digital conversion
WUCF-TV (as WMFE-TV) shut down its analog signal, over UHF channel 24, on February 17, 2009, the original target date in which full-power television stations in the United States were to transition from analog to digital broadcasts under federal mandate (which was later pushed back to June 12, 2009). The station's digital signal continued to broadcasts on its pre-transition UHF channel 23. Through the use of PSIP, digital television receivers display the station's virtual channel as its former UHF analog channel 24.

Previously, other digital subchannels offered by WMFE included WMFE Encore!, which featured second runs of popular PBS programs from 6 a.m. to 7 p.m. and local government programs 7 p.m. until midnight; and WMFE ED, which was available 6 a.m. to 7 p.m., featuring educational programs for schools from the Florida Knowledge Network on weekdays, and children's programs on weekends. These subchannels ceased on July 1, 2011 after WMFE's contract with PBS expired due to its pending sale to Daystar. In the interim period between WMFE ending PBS membership and WUCF assuming control of the station, it carried the Spanish-language V-me network on all three subchannels, with the 24.1 signal remaining in HD despite V-me only being operated in standard definition. Under WMFE's control, the station's transmitter was off the air from midnight to 7 a.m., while Bright House received a 24-hour feed of the station featuring PBS's overnight schedule during off-the-air hours. V-me ended their run on WMFE/WUCF on January 16, 2017 upon the launch of the 24-hour PBS Kids channel.

At WBCC, WUCF-TV also offered UCF-TV, which featured original content, such as university sporting events, as well as partnership programs. This was discontinued following WUCF's move to channel 24 in November 2012.

On March 9, 2018, WUCF-TV began to host WTGL under a channel sharing agreement after WTGL's sale of their spectrum in the 2016 FCC auction.

References

External links

University of Central Florida
PBS member stations
UCF-TV
Television channels and stations established in 1965
1965 establishments in Florida